"With My Own Eyes" is a song by German production group Sash!. It was released on 4 September 2000 via X-IT Records as the third single from their third  album Trilenium. The song features Finnish singer Inka Auhagen. The song was a hit in several European countries, reaching number 10 on the UK Singles Chart. It was Sash!'s last top-10 single on that chart until 2008.

Track listing

Credits
 Producer – Sash!, Tokapi 
 Vocals – Inka (tracks 1 to 3) 
 Writers – R. Kappmeier, S. Lappessen, T. Alisson
 Produced at Pink Elephant Studios
 Published by Step By Step

Charts

Weekly charts

Year-end charts

References

2000 singles
2000 songs
Multiply Records singles
Sash! songs